Ankit Mohan is an Indian film and television actor who mainly works in Marathi cinema. He is known for television shows like Mahabharat, Kumkum Bhagya, Naagin 3, Haiwaan and Kaatelal & Sons as well as the Marathi film Farzand.

Personal life
On 2 December 2015 he married Indian television actress Ruchi Savarn, his co star, whom he met on the sets of Ghar Aaja Pardesi. In September 2021, the couple announced they were expecting their first child. On 7 December 2021, the couple welcomed a baby boy.

Career
Ankit Mohan made his debut in MTV Roadies (season 4). Ankit appeared in Pankaj Kapoor's Mausam, In which he played Ashfaq Hussain, an Air Force officer. He was selected from over 800 guys for the role of Shahid Kapoor's best friend. He has appeared in many Hindi TV serials like Ghar Aaja Pardesi, Basera and Shobha Somnath Ki. He also appeared in Star Plus's Mahabharat as Ashwathama and in Zee TV's Kumkum Bhagya as Aakash. In 2018 Mohan was seen in the superhit Marathi movie Farzand in which he played the title character of the legendary Maratha warrior Kondaji Farzand.

Mohan performed the role of Aakash on the show Kumkum Bhagya until 2016. He played the part of Yuvi in the television show Naagin 3. At first after 7-8 he left as he was shown killed by Vishakha Anita Hassanandani. Again in December 2018 he returned to the show as a shape-shifting serpent son of Nidhogsh Vansh Queen, Sumitra Rakshanda Khan. He was shown killed by Bela Surbhi Jyoti and Vishakha Anita Hassanandani in 2019. Finally, he left the role in April, 2019. He was last seen as the male lead, Vikram in Sony Sab's Kaatelal & Sons opposite Megha Chakraborty.

Filmography

Films

Television

Web series

Media 
He was ranked thirteenth in The Times of India's Top 30 Most Desirable Men of Maharashtra in 2019. He was ranked eighteenth in The Times of India's Top 20 Most Desirable Men of Maharashtra in 2020.

References

External links
 

Living people
Male actors in Hindi television
Male actors from Delhi
21st-century Indian male actors
MTV Roadies contestants
1988 births
Actors from Delhi